Peridroma albiorbis is a moth of the family Noctuidae. It was first described by William Warren in 1912. It is endemic to the island of Hawaii.

Larvae have been recorded feeding on māmane seeds.

External links

Noctuinae
Endemic moths of Hawaii
Moths described in 1912